Jonathan Ondreal Mingo (born April 20, 2001) is an American football wide receiver for the Ole Miss Rebels.

Early life and high school
Mingo grew up in Brandon, Mississippi and attended Brandon High School. Mingo was rated a four-star recruit and committed to play college football at Ole Miss over offers from Georgia, Auburn, and Mississippi State.

College career
Mingo started all 12 of Ole Miss's games as a freshman and finished the season with 12 receptions for 172 yards and one touchdown. He caught 27 passes for 379 yards and three touchdowns during his sophomore season. Mingo missed seven games due to a foot injury in his junior season and finished the year with 22 receptions for 346 yards with three touchdowns. He set a new school record for receiving yards in a game with 247 on nine receptions and scored two touchdowns on October 8, 2022, in a 52–28 win over Vanderbilt.

References

External links
Ole Miss Rebels bio

2001 births
Living people
American football wide receivers
Ole Miss Rebels football players
Players of American football from Mississippi